Bernard Lamarche-Vadel (16 July 1949, Avallon. – 2 May 2000, La Croixille in Mayenne) was a French writer, poet, art critic and collector.

Life 
The son of a veterinarian, self-taught, his tastes for art and literature earned him a paternal anathema. At 19 years he met  whose name he joined to his. A graduate from the École pratique des hautes études in art sociology (1970), he subsequently taught at the Paris-I Panthéon-Sorbonne University and then at ICART in 1979. A poet and short stories writer, Bernard Lamarche-Vadel composed a work of art critic in the 1970s and founded the magazine Artistes. He also organized numerous exhibitions ("Jean Degottex. Rétrospective", 1978, musée d'Art moderne (ARC), Paris / « Finir en beauté », juin 1981)

He committed suicide in 2000 aged 50, in his castle of La Rongère.

An exhibition devoted to his work of art critic was presented in 2009 by the Musée d'Art Moderne de la Ville de Paris.

Works 

1976: Michel-Ange,
1976: Du chien les bonbonnes, Bourgois
1978: Degottex, l'œuvre de Jean Degottex et la question du tableau. Musée de Grenoble / Musée d'art et d'industrie, Saint-Étienne
1978: L'Efficacité des rouges, Bourgois
1979: Giacometti
1980: Jean-Pierre Pincemin, Bourgois
1981: Helmut Newton, Regard
1982: Cols de l'accent violent, éditions Unes
1983: Pour Bram Van Velde, éditions Unes
1983: Lisible pour M.,  éditions Unes
1983: Collection Bernard Lamarche-Vadel, Musée Sainte-Croix, Poitiers
1984: Château dernier, éditions Unes
1985: Catalogue Maeght n°32 : peintures 1965-1980
1985: Joseph Beuys, Marval
1985: Alberto Giacometti, N.E.F.
1985: Klossowski, l'énoncé dénoncé, Marval
1985: , Action régionale pour la création artistique
1985: Sidérations : l'atelier photographique français. Coedition Tours, Liège, Rome. Centre de Création Contemporaine : Carte Segrete
1985: Tapiès, peinture 1965-1980, Maeght
1986: Opalka, 1965, la Différence
1986: Qu'est-ce que l'art français ?, La Différence
1987: Continent Kirkeby. Centre de création contemporaine de Tours
1987: Pierre Klossowski
1987: Éric Dalbis, La Différence
1987: Hucleux, La Différence
1987: Zoo, Jean-Philippe Reverdot, Marval
1988: Majy Magie, La Différence
 Points de mire
1988: Mimmo Paladino, le guetteur, La Différence
1988: Olivier Thomé: propos La Différence
 Unes-Nues, photographs by Jean Rault, texts by Régis Durand and Bernard Lamarche-Vadel
1990: , La Différence
1990: Facile, Marval
1990: Jean-Michel Sanejouand, les charges-objets, La Différence
1990: Villeglé, Marval
1992: Les Espionnes, (collaboration, B. Rheims, G. Kehayoff)
  - (DEHORS), (collaboration, Yannick Miloux), Rennes, La Criée, 1992, 36 p.
1993: Le Bonheur, (collaboration F. Chevallier), La Différence
1993: Vitré, La Différence
1993: Lewis Baltz, La Différence
1993: Arman [Classiques du XXIe]
1993: Vétérinaires, (Prix Goncourt du premier roman 1994)
1995: Bugatti : les meubles, les sculptures, les autos, (collaboration B. Dufour), La Différence
1995: Carmelo Zagari, La Différence
1995: Tout casse, Gallimard
1995: Lignes de mire : écrits sur la photographie, Marval
1996: La logeuse, (collaboration Y. Guillot), Marval
1997: Entretiens, témoignages, études critiques (dir. I. Rabineau. Méréal)
1997: Sa vie, son œuvre, dedicated to Philippe Sollers
1997: Fos, natures d'un lieu, images en manœuvres
1998: L'art, le suicide, la princesse et son agonie
1999: Comment jouer Enfermement, Christian Bourgois, Paris
1999: Arman, La Différence
2000: De la douce hystérie des bilans, éditions Unes
 Mise en demeure, (photographs Jean-Philippe Reverdot), his last novel

Filmography 
 Bernard Lamarche-Vadel appareared in L'Argent (1983) by Robert Bresson

Bibliography 
1997: Bernard Lamarche-Vadel, Entretiens, témoignages, critiques (under the direction of Isabelle Rabineau), Éditions Méréal, Paris 
1999: Le Dos du collectionneur, Une photographie de l'enfermement, éditions méréal, Maison européenne de la Photographie.
2005: Conférences de Bernard Lamarche-Vadel.
2009: Dans l'œil du critique. Bernard Lamarche-Vadel et les artistes, catalog of the exhibition, Paris Musées
2009: Face à Lamarche-Vadel, collective, éditions Inculte

References

External links 
 Bernard Lamarche-Vadel mettait fin à ses jours le 2 mai on L'Express (1 October 200)
 Bernard Lamarche-Vadel, la flamboyance d'un regard on Le Monde (1 June 2009)
 Bernard Lamarche-Vadel on Encyclopedia Universalis
 Conférences de Bernard Lamarche-Vadel : la bande-son de l’art contemporain on Critique d'Art
 Bernard Lamarche Vadel, Conférence à la villa d’Arson, 1989 on YouTube
 Oraison funèbre de Rémi Blanchard, prononcée en l'église Saint-Germain-des-Prés, le 19 mai 1993

20th-century French poets
French collectors
Prix Goncourt du Premier Roman recipients
French art critics
Suicides in France
People from Avallon
1949 births
2000 suicides
2000 deaths